Ricky Dixon (born 29 October 1969) is a Nicaraguan judoka. He competed in the men's half-middleweight event at the 1996 Summer Olympics.

References

External links
 

1969 births
Living people
Nicaraguan male judoka
Olympic judoka of Nicaragua
Judoka at the 1996 Summer Olympics
Place of birth missing (living people)